is a Japanese actor, Butoka, and theater director.

Early life 
In 1943, Maro was born in Sakurai, Nara, Japan.

Career 
Maro's film career began in 1980. As an actor, Maro has over 42 film. In 1972 Maro is the founder of Dairakudakan Temputenshiki.

Personal life 
Maro's sons are film director Tatsushi Ōmori, a film director, and Nao Ōmori, an actor.

Filmography

Film

Inflatable Sex Doll of the Wastelands (1967)
Ke no haeta kenjû (1968) as Taka
Diary of a Shinjuku Thief (1969)
Yami no naka no chimimoryo (1971) as Kinzo
Kuroki Taro no ai to bôken (1977)
Zigeunerweisen (1980)
Kagero-za (1981) as Homeless
Burst City (1982)
Yaju-deka (1982) as Painter
Mitsugetsu (1984)
Shinran: Path to Purity (1987) as Nanzame
Nijisseiki shônen dokuhon (1989) as Tattoo Master
Dotsuitarunen (1989) as Daisuke Kamoi
Ware ni utsu yoi ari (1990) as Sakurada
Yumeji (1991)
Waga jinsei saiaku no toki (1993) as Lt. Nakayama
Tsuki wa dotchi ni dete iru (1993) as Senba
Heya (1993)
Shishioh-tachi no saigo (1993) as Sakurai
Kowagaru hitobito (1994) as Man of dry river bed
Aozora ni ichiban chikai basho (1994)
Yamato Takeru (1994)
Heisei musekinin-ikka: Tokyo de luxe (1995) as Kanji, Nobuko's father
Harukana jidai no kaidan o (1995) as Detective
Gogo no Yuigon-jo (1995)
That's Cunning! Shijo saidai no sakusen (1996)
Dangan Runner (1996)
Wana (1996) as Detective
Moonlight Serenade (1997)
Kizu darake no tenshi (1997) as Owner of the firm
Postman Blues (1997) as Boss of Minato gang
Cat's Eye (1997)
Lie lie Lie (1997) as Den
Pieta (1997) as Cop
Anrakkî monkî (1998) as Hobo
Shinsei toire no Hanako-san (1998)
Kunoichi ninpô-chô: Yagyû gaiden (1998) as Tenkai
Pornostar (1998) as Yakuza Boss
Gedo (1998) as Kuwata
Shin karajishi kabushiki kaisha (1999)
Kikujiro (1999) as Crazy Man
Tenshi ni misuterareta yoru (1999) as Aota
Gemini (1999) as Kakubê
The City of Lost Souls (2000)
Swing Man (2000) as Oda
Kamen gakuen (2001) as Daimon
Monday (2000)
Utsushimi (2000) as Himself
Suicide Club (2001) as Detective Murata
Gin no otoko (2001, part 1, 2)
KT (2002) as Susumu Kawahara
Shangri-La (2002) as Ookura Nagashima
Drive (2002) as Lord Kobari, ghost warrior
Jam Films (2002) (segment "Pandora - Hong Kong Leg")
Gangu shuriya (2002) as Mr. Iwai
Makai Tensho (2003) as Ieyasu Tokugawa
9 Souls (2003) as Owner of Candy Shop
Kill Bill: Volume 1 (2003) as Boss Ozawah
Akame shijuya taki shinju misui (2003)
Kill Bill: Volume 2 (2004) as Boss Ozawah
Wairudo furawazu (2004)
The Reason (2004) as A-san
Yume no naka e (2005)
The Whispering of the Gods (2005) as Shopkeeper
Damejin (2006)
Pacchigi! Love & Peace (2007)
Hadaka no natsu (2008)
Shôrin shôjo (2008) as Rin's Master
Asahiyama dôbutsuen: Pengin ga sora o tobu (2008)
Sakigake!! Otokojuku (2008) as Heihachi Edajima
Futoko (2009)
Mogera wogura (2009)
Kazura (2010)
Meon (2010)
Ichimai no hagaki (2010) as Monk
Yakuza Weapon (2011)
Tada's Do-It-All House (2011) as Oka
Hanezu (2011) as Yo-chan archeologist
Gokudô meshi (2011)
Tenshi tsukinuke rokuchoume (2011)
Kôun no tsubo (2012) as Yonosuke
SPEC: Ten (2012) as Akira Nitanai
TAP: Kanzennaru shiiku (2013)
A no dentou (2014)
Zipang Punk (2014) as Toyotomi Hideyoshi
Mahoro ekimae kyôsôkyoku (2014)
Kakekomi (2015) as Seisetsu
The Emperor in August (2015) as Hisanori Fujita
Danchi (2016) as Gondo
Nekonin (2017) as Katsuragi
Sekigahara (2017) as Shimazu Yoshihiro
Uta Monogatari: Cinema Fighters Project (2018) as On (segment "Kuu")
Turquoise no Sora no Shita de (2018)
Fly Me to the Saitama (2019) as Sojuro Saionji
Birdsong (2019) as Akira
Ghost Master (2019)
Katsu Fūtarō!! (2019)
Hell Girl (2019) as Wanyūdō
Dreams on Fire (2021)
Under the Turquoise Sky (2021)
Daughter of Lupin the Movie (2021)
Tombi: Father and Son (2022)
Ox-Head Village (2022)
Fullmetal Alchemist: The Revenge of Scar (2022)
Old School (2022)
We Make Antiques! Osaka Dreams (2023)

Television
Kindaichi Case Files (1996)
Psychometrer Eiji (1997)
Aoi Tokugawa Sandai (2000) as Shimazu Yoshihiro
GARO (2006)
Yamada Tarō Monogatari (2007)
Atsuhime (2008)
Gunshi Kanbei (2014) as Enman
Smoking (2018) as Sunaji
Manpuku (2018)
Daughter of Lupin (2019–20)

References

External links
Dairakudakan
 

Japanese male actors
Butoh
1943 births
Actors from Nara Prefecture
Living people